Salvador Alvarado Municipality is in the Mexican state of Sinaloa. It stands at 
.

The municipality reported 79,085 inhabitants in the 2010 census and has an areal extent of 1,197.5 km² (462.36 sq mi). Its municipal seat is the city of Guamúchil. The largest other community in the municipality is the town of Benito Juárez (population 5,128).

References

Sinaloa Enciclopedia de los Municipios de México

External links
Municipio de Salvador Alvarado Official website
Gobierno del Estado de Sinaloa Official website of State of Sinaloa

Municipalities of Sinaloa